David Bennett McKinley (born March 28, 1947) is an American businessman and politician who served as the U.S. representative for  from 2011 to 2023. A member of the Republican Party, McKinley was a member of the West Virginia House of Delegates from 1980 to 1994, and chaired the West Virginia Republican Party from 1990 to 1994.Greg Martin

McKinley is generally considered a moderate Republican. After West Virginia lost a House seat in the 2020 redistricting cycle, his district was merged with that of Representative Alex Mooney. McKinley lost to Mooney with 35.6% of the vote in the 2022 Republican primary.

Early life and education
McKinley was born in Wheeling, West Virginia. He earned a Bachelor of Science degree in engineering from Purdue University in 1970.

Early career 
McKinley worked as a civil engineer for 12 years until founding his own firm, McKinley and Associates, based in Wheeling. The 40-member firm has been involved in $1 billion in construction projects over the past 30 years.

McKinley has renovated structures of historic significance in West Virginia communities, such as the Capitol Theatre in Wheeling.

McKinley was a member of the West Virginia House of Delegates from 1980 to 1994. From 1990 to 1994, he chaired the West Virginia Republican Party. As chair, he was very critical of West Virginia's two Democratic U.S. senators. In 1991, he criticized Senator Jay Rockefeller for exploring a run for president against President George H. W. Bush. In 1994, he criticized Senator Robert Byrd for opposing a Balanced Budget Amendment.

In 1996, McKinley ran in the Republican primary for governor against astronaut Jon McBride and former governor Cecil Underwood. He came in third place; Underwood won the general election.

U.S. House of Representatives

Elections

2010

The Democratic incumbent, Alan Mollohan, lost the Democratic primary to the more conservative State Senator Mike Oliverio. McKinley won the six-candidate Republican primary with 35% of the vote. Mac Warner ranked second with 27% of the vote and State Senator Sarah Minear ranked third with 21%.

McKinley received many endorsements during his campaign, including from Parkersburg News, National Right to Life, the West Virginians for Life PAC, the National Federation of Independent Business, House Republicans Fund, West Virginia Farm Bureau, and the International Brotherhood of Electrical Workers.

McKinley narrowly defeated Oliverio, 50.4%–49.6%, a difference of just 1,440 votes. He became only the fourth person to represent the district since 1953.

2012

McKinley ran for reelection in the newly redrawn 1st district. He defeated Democratic nominee Sue Thorn, a former community organizer, 62%–38%, winning every county in the district.

2014

In 2013, McKinley announced that he would not run for the open U.S. Senate seat being vacated by Jay Rockefeller in 2014.

McKinley defeated the Democratic nominee, West Virginia State Auditor Glen Gainer III, 64%–36%.

2016

In 2016, McKinley defeated former State Delegate Mike Manypenny, 69%–31%.

2018

In 2018, McKinley defeated West Virginia University law professor Kendra Fershee, 64.6%–35.4%.

2020

In 2020, McKinley defeated computational linguist Natalie Cline 69%–31%.

2022

As a result of the 2020 United States Census and the 2020 redistricting cycle, the West Virginia legislature divided the state into northern and southern districts, and abandoned its longtime practice of starting the numbering in the north, assigning the southern counties to the new 1st district. This resulted in McKinley and 2nd district Representative Alex Mooney being together in the new 2nd district, and both incumbents declared their intention to run in the district.

In a race that received nationwide attention, Mooney defeated McKinley in the Republican primary on May 10. Donald Trump endorsed Mooney before the election, and McKinley, who has been ranked as one of the most bipartisan members of Congress, was criticized for holding moderate views.

Tenure
McKinley has broken ranks with the Republican majority several times in his tenure in Congress. In April 2011, he was one of only four Republican members of Congress to vote against the Republican budget proposal of 2012. He said, "As it relates to the Medicare, I applaud what Paul Ryan was trying to do, because we need to have an adult conversation about it. The Congressional Budget Office determined that some of the out-of-pocket costs could double for seniors and that sent up a red flag for me that we need to look at it."

McKinley was ranked the 22nd most bipartisan member of the House during the 114th United States Congress (and the most bipartisan House member from West Virginia) by the Bipartisan Index created by The Lugar Center and the McCourt School of Public Policy, which ranks members of Congress by their degree of bipartisanship (by measuring how often each member's bills attract co-sponsors from the opposite party and each member co-sponsors bills by members of the opposite party).

Political positions

Jobs
McKinley is an active supporter of the Coal Miner Employment and Domestic Energy Infrastructure Protection Act. Also known as the Stop the War on Coal Act, it aims to protect American jobs and prevent legislation that would reduce mining jobs. McKinley has said, "The constant attacks on coal have to stop."

McKinley was one of 233 representatives in favor of the act, which passed in September 2012. He said, "Our job creators need a consistent and predictable regulatory program that will protect jobs we have and create new one." On November 5, 2021, McKinley was one of 13 House Republicans to break with their party and vote with a majority of Democrats in favor of the Infrastructure Investment and Jobs Act.

In October 2011, McKinley was the only Republican freshman to vote against all three of the trade deals passed by Congress: Panama, Colombia, and South Korea. He said, "Free trade deals like NAFTA and CAFTA have been nothing more than broken promises that shipped our jobs overseas, and I won’t vote for any free trade agreements unless they’re fair to my constituents."

McKinley has expressed concern about the United States' "unchecked spending", which he says results in being "beholden to countries like China and Japan who own a significant amount of our debt".

Gun control
McKinley is a strong supporter of the notion that people should be allowed to carry a concealed weapon. He has been consistent in his voting patterns on gun control and continued this trend when voting yes on Requiring State Reciprocity for Carrying Concealed Firearms. He received an “A” rating from the National Rifle Association. In 2012 the NRA was one of McKinley’s main endorsers.

Abortion
McKinley opposes abortion rights. He believes "[t]he use of federal funds to pay for ending the life of an unborn child is appalling", even though federal funds are not used to pay for abortions, per the Hyde Amendment. He voted for the District of Columbia Pain-Capable Unborn Child Protection Act in July 2012, which did not pass. This act would have prohibited abortion in the District of Columbia. The National Right to Life Committee gave McKinley a 100% rating on abortion issues from 2011 to the present.

Climate change
On May 23, 2013, McKinley introduced the Better Buildings Act of 2014. The bill would amend federal law aimed at improving the energy efficiency of commercial office buildings. It would create a program called "Tenant Star" similar to the existing Energy Star program. He argued in favor of the bill, saying, "finding ways to use energy efficiently is common sense. We ought to be promoting efficiency as a way to save energy, money and create jobs."

In May 2014, McKinley offered an amendment to the Howard P. "Buck" McKeon National Defense Authorization Act for Fiscal Year 2015 that bars the Department of Defense from using funds to assess climate change and its implications for national security.

In January 2020, McKinley and Representative Kurt Schrader co-authored an opinion piece for USA Today on climate change. It read in part, "climate change is the greatest environmental and energy challenge of our time, and our government is failing to meet it. Instead of energy policy that lurches in a different direction after every election cycle, we need a new approach to develop realistic solutions that will enjoy support from both parties in Congress. Setting a steady course would be far better for both industry and the environment." The piece also called for "policies that will make clean energy technologies for all fuels affordable—solar, wind, hydro and other renewables, as well as nuclear, carbon capture for fossil fuels, energy efficiency, storage, and other technologies that will make the grid more secure, resilient, and affordable."

January 6 commission
On May 19, 2021, McKinley was one of 35 Republicans who joined all Democrats in voting to approve legislation to establish the January 6 commission meant to investigate the storming of the U.S. Capitol.

Vaccination
On November 30, McKinley was the only West Virginia representative to vote for of H.R. 550: Immunization Infrastructure Modernization Act of 2021. The bill helps create confidential, population-based databases that maintain a record of vaccine administrations.

LGBT rights
In 2015, McKinley was one of 60 Republicans voting to uphold President Barack Obama’s 2014 executive order banning federal contractors from making hiring decisions that discriminate based on sexual orientation or gender identity.

Committee assignments
 Committee on Energy and Commerce
 Subcommittee on Energy and Power
 Subcommittee on Environment and Climate Change
 Subcommittee on Oversight and Investigations

Caucus memberships
 Republican Study Committee
United States Congressional International Conservation Caucus
 Marcellus Shale Caucus (Founder)
 Tea Party Caucus
 Congressional Arts Caucus
 Congressional Cement Caucus
Republican Main Street Partnership
Republican Governance Group

Personal life
McKinley is a seventh-generation resident of Wheeling, West Virginia. He has four children and six grandchildren. His wife, Mary, has been a critical care nurse for 39 years. She holds a master's degree in nursing.

References

External links
 
 
 

|-

|-

1947 births
21st-century American politicians
American civil engineers
American Episcopalians
Businesspeople from West Virginia
Engineers from West Virginia
Episcopalians from West Virginia
Living people
Politicians from Wheeling, West Virginia
Purdue University alumni
Republican Party members of the United States House of Representatives from West Virginia
Republican Party members of the West Virginia House of Delegates
State political party chairs of West Virginia
Tea Party movement activists